Placoclytus is a genus of beetles in the family Cerambycidae, containing the following species:

 Placoclytus championi (Bates, 1885)
 Placoclytus distortus (Chevrolat, 1860)
 Placoclytus virgulatus Chemsak & Linsley, 1974

References

Clytini